Thaumaptilon is a fossil genus of animals from the middle Cambrian Burgess Shale which some authors have compared to members of the Ediacaran biota, generally believed to have disappeared at the start of the Cambrian, . It was up to 20 cm long, and attached itself to the sea floor with a holdfast.

Leaf-shaped, Thaumaptilon had a central axis extending to its tip, with many "ribs" radiating from it, in a similar manner to the ribs of a leaf. These may have had canals connecting them to the axis. One side of its surface was covered in spots, which might have been zooids.

Thaumaptilon is considered important due to its resemblance to some Ediacarans; it was believed to be a relative of forms such as Charnia.

Forms related to Charnia were once believed to be related to sea-pens (pennatulacean cnidarians), although this hypothesis has been questioned based on several lines of evidence.

The name Thaumaptilon is said to be derived from the Greek thauma, "wonderful", + , "soft feather". In ancient Greek, thauma (θαῦμα) however means "wonder".

See also
 Ediacaran biota

References

External links 
 
 http://paleobiology.si.edu/burgess/thaumaptilon.html

Burgess Shale fossils
Ediacaran life
Prehistoric cnidarian genera

Cambrian genus extinctions